IGR may refer to:

 Iguazu International Airport serving Puerto Iguazú and the nearby falls
 IGR Iwate Ginga Railway in Iwate Prefecture, Japan
 Imperial Japanese Government Railways (or, domestically, Imperial Government Railways) of early 20th century Japan
 Indiana Guard Reserve, the state defense force of Indiana
 International Gay Rugby
 Insect growth regulator, a chemical that disrupts the growth and/or development of insects
 The Interessengemeinschaft für Rundfunkschutzrechte (IGR), a broadcasting "IP" rights interest group
 IGR Stereo, a German standard for analogue TV stereo audio transmission claimed by the above organization.
 Intergenic region
 Integral Gamma-Ray source, a catalog based on observations by the INTEGRAL telescope